The Solicitors Act 1974 (c 47) is an Act of the Parliament of the United Kingdom governing the regulation and responsibilities of practicing solicitors, and the firms for whom they work, as well as stipulating under what circumstances one can practise as a solicitor. It also sets out the powers used by the solicitors governing body, the Solicitors Regulation Authority.

The Act reserves certain activities for solicitors. Broadly, these include:

 Preparing and lodging certain documents concerning the conveyance or charging of land; Since repealed.
 Certain probate functions
 Undertaking litigation in open court

See also
Solicitors Act

External links

United Kingdom Acts of Parliament 1974
Solicitors